"I Like It Like That" is a song by Chris Kenner and Allen Toussaint, first recorded by Kenner, whose version reached No. 2 on the Billboard Hot 100 chart in 1961. It was kept from the No.1 spot by "Tossin' and Turnin'" by Bobby Lewis.  This version also went to No. 2 on the R&B singles chart, also behind "Tossin' and Turnin'".  The narrator of the song invites the listener to come with him to a happening spot named "I Like It Like That". The lyrics in Kenner's version are mostly spoken in the verses, as well as saying the line: "The name of the place is".

Cover versions
The song was covered by the Dave Clark Five in 1965. All of the lyrics were sung in that version. Their version charted at No. 7 on the Billboard Hot 100. Cash Box said that the Dave Clark Five play "the pulsating teen-angled terpsichorean-themed affair in a contagious warm-hearted bluesy style."
Michael Landon covered the song in the opening number of NBC's Hullabaloo (1965) 
The Nashville Teens recorded the song as a B-side to their hit single "Tobacco Road" (1964).
The song was also covered by the Kingsmen on their 1965 album The Kingmen on Campus
Brinsley Schwarz on their 1972 album Nervous on the Road
Loggins and Messina on their 1975 album of cover songs, So Fine (US #84).

This song is referenced in the Contours song "Do you love me",(1962), with the line: "Do you like it like this".

This song is excerpted in the novelty number "Berlin Top Ten" (1961), by Buchanan and Goodman, when Boris the spinner, the people's disc jockeys intones "You've got to like it like that" as the name of the place.

Steve Martin (1978) used the spoken verse style in his hit King Tut (song).

Song use in film
The song is featured in Stanley Kubrick's 1987 Vietnam War film Full Metal Jacket.

References

1961 songs
1961 singles
1965 singles
Songs written by Chris Kenner
The Dave Clark Five songs
Loggins and Messina songs
Epic Records singles
Songs written by Allen Toussaint